Turmstraße (Tower street) is a main street in the Berlin district of Moabit.

The street runs along the "Kleiner Tiergarten" park, and past the Moabit courthouse.

Turmstraße is also the name of an U-Bahn stop on the U9.

Moabit Courthouse and Moabit Hospital are located over here, as shown in the images on the right.

External links
 Complete path of the Turmstraße 1837

References 
 luise-berlin.de
 Berlin-Ehrungen.de

Streets in Berlin
Odonyms referring to a building
Moabit
Mitte